The Mdina steles are two Phoenician language inscriptions found near the city of Mdina (ancient Maleth), Malta, in 1816. The findspot is disputed; the oldest known description places it near the Tal-Virtù Church. The surviving stele is currently in the National Museum of Archaeology, Malta; the other stele has been considered lost for more than a century.

They were widely publicized by Wilhelm Gesenius as Melitensia Tertia and Melitensia Quarta ("Maltese 3rd" and "Maltese 4th"). They are also known as KAI 61A,B or CIS i 123A,B.

Stele 61B has been dated to the sixth century BCE on the basis of letter forms.

Text of the inscriptions
The two inscriptions read:

{|
|+ 
|-
| (A, lines 1-6) || NṢB MLK / B‘L ’Š Š/M NḤM LB/‘L-ḤMN ’/DN K ŠM‘ / QL DBRY || (This is) a stele (commemorating) a molk-Ba‘al (or molkomor?) that Naḥḥum presented to Baal-ḥammon, his Lord, because he has heard the sound of his word(s) (i.e., Ba‘al had answered Naḥḥum's prayers).
|-
| (B, lines 1-6) || NṢB MLK / ’MR ’Š Š/[M ’R]Š  LB/‘L-[ḤMN] ’DN [K Š]M‘ / QL [DB]RY || (This is) a stele (commemorating) a «molkomor» that ’Aris presented to Baal-ḥammon, his Lord, because he has heard the sound of his word(s).
|}

A "molkomor" (as in B) was a "substitute" sacrificial offering to Ba‘al of a lamb instead of a child. The word is a composite of molk or Moloch, traditionally the Punic god Ba‘al but more probably meaning "(human) sacrifice (of a child)", and ’MR (cf. Hebrew ’immēr), "lamb". Another possible reading is "MLK’SR", meaning Moloch-Osiris, who was also worshiped by the Phoenicians.

It is not clear whether molk-Ba‘al in A is a variant of molkomor, or that 61A refers to a real child sacrifice, while 61B refers to a substitute offering.

Gallery

References

Phoenician inscriptions
Archaeological discoveries in Malta
1816 archaeological discoveries
Mdina
Phoenician steles
Archaeological artifacts